The 1981–82 Calgary Flames season was the second season in Calgary and tenth for the Flames franchise in the National Hockey League.  The follow-up to the Flames' first season in Calgary proved to be disappointing on the ice. Twenty-nine wins represented the Flames lowest total since the franchise's inaugural season in Atlanta.  Despite the poor record, Calgary finished in third place in the newly organized Smythe Division, earning a playoff match-up against the Vancouver Canucks.  The Flames returned to their Atlanta form, being swept out of the post-season in three straight games, as the Canucks began their run to the Stanley Cup Finals.

The 1981–82 season saw the Flames acquire Lanny McDonald from the Colorado Rockies, bringing the Hanna, Alberta product home.  Sporting his trademark moustache, McDonald would spend his final seven seasons with the Flames, and remains an icon in Calgary.  McDonald would score 34 of his 40 goals that season in a Flames uniform.

Pekka Rautakallio was the Flames representative at the 1982 All-Star Game.

Regular season

Season standings

Schedule and results

Playoffs

Player statistics

Skaters
Note: GP = Games played; G = Goals; A = Assists; Pts = Points; PIM = Penalty minutes

†Denotes player spent time with another team before joining Calgary.  Stats reflect time with the Flames only.
‡Traded mid-season.

Goaltenders
Note: GP = Games played; TOI = Time on ice (minutes); W = Wins; L = Losses; OT = Overtime/shootout losses; GA = Goals against; SO = Shutouts; GAA = Goals against average

Transactions
The Flames were involved in the following transactions during the 1981–82 season.

Trades

Free agents

Draft picks

Calgary's picks at the 1981 NHL Entry Draft, held in Montreal, Quebec.

See also
1981–82 NHL season

References

Player stats: 2007–08 Calgary Flames Media Guide, p. 130.
Game log: 2007–08 Calgary Flames Media Guide, p. 141.
Team standings:  1981–82 NHL standings @hockeydb.com
Trades: Individual player pages at hockeydb.com

Calgary Flames seasons
Calgary Flames season, 1981-82
Calg